The 2011–12 Xavier Musketeers men's basketball team represented Xavier University in the 2011–12 NCAA Divisions I Men's Basketball Season. Xavier was led by head coach Chris Mack in his third season at Xavier. The Musketeers competed in the Atlantic 10 Conference and played their home games at the Cintas Center. Xavier finished the season 23-13,10–6 in A-10 play to finish in tie for third place in conference. The Musketeers lost to St. Bonaventure in the championship of the A-10 tournament. Xavier received a #10 seed in the NCAA tournament. The Musketeers defeated Notre Dame and Lehigh to reach the Sweet Sixteen where they were defeated by Baylor.

Previous season
The Musketeers finished the 2010–11 season 24–8, 15–1 in A-10 play to win the regular season championship. They lost in the quarterfinals of the A-10 tournament to Dayton. The Musketeers received an at-large bid as a #6 seed to the NCAA tournament where they lost in Second Round to Marquette.

Preseason
On October 13, 2011, the Musketeers were picked by other Atlantic 10 coaches to finish first in the league standings and received 18 first place votes. Kenny Freese and Mark Lyons were named to the All-Conference Second Team.  Justin Martin and Dez Wells were selected to the 2011–12 preseason Atlantic 10 Conference All-Rookie Team.

Senior Center Kenny Frease was suspended from October 14 through October 23 for not fulfilling all of the responsibilities of a Xavier basketball player. Frease was reinstated on October 23.  Senior Tu Holloway sat out the first game of the season because of a secondary violation of NCAA rules. Sources believe Holloway played in two summer leagues. The NCAA allows players to compete in one.

Roster

Schedule and results

|-
!colspan=9 style="background:#062252; color:#FFFFFF;"| Exhibition

|-
!colspan=9 style="background:#062252; color:#FFFFFF;"| Regular season

|-
!colspan=9 style="background:#062252; color:#FFFFFF;"| A-10 tournament

|-
!colspan=9 style="background:#062252; color:#FFFFFF;"| NCAA tournament

References

Xavier
Xavier Musketeers men's basketball seasons
Xavier